Sweeter Than the Radio is the third album by Australian rock band Icecream Hands. It was released in 1999 and was nominated for the ARIA Award for Best Adult Contemporary Album at the ARIA Music Awards of 2000.

Track listing
(All songs by Charles Jenkins except where noted)
 "Can Anyone Be Hypnotised?" — 3:21
 "Spiritlevel Windowsill" — 2:26
 "Dodgy" (Charles Jenkins, Douglas Lee Robertson) — 2:40
 "Rise, Fall & Roll" — 3:07
 "Nipple" — 3:41
 "Yellow & Blue" (Robertson) — 2:31
 "Gasworks Park" — 5:18
 "Picture Disc From the Benelux" (Derek G. Smiley, Douglas Lee Robertson, Charles Jenkins) — 3:18
 "Bad Hip" — 3:07
 "You Could Be Reported" — 4:12
 "Giving It All Away" — 3:43
 "Stupid Boy" — 3:05
 "Magic Pudding Blues" — 1:54
 The Obvious Boy" — 3:28
 "Seawall" — 2:01

Personnel

 Marcus Goodwin — guitar
 Charles Jenkins — guitar, vocals
 Douglas Lee Robertson — bass, vocals
 Derek G. Smiley — drums, vocals

Additional personnel

 David Owen — keyboards ("Can Anyone Be Hypnotised?", "Dodgy")
 Elroy Falcon — guitar ("Dodgy," "Bad Hip," "Magic Pudding Blues")
 Anita Quayle — cello
 Craig Harnath — keyboards ("Gasworks Park")

References

1999 albums